Sweden competed at the 2013 Summer Universiade in Kazan, Russia from 6 to 17 July 2013.

Athletics

Track & road events

Field events

Badminton

Basketball

Men's tournament

Players: Alexander Lindqvist, Gustav Sundström, Andreas Karlsson, Johan Rönström, Andreas Person, Mike Joseph, Charles Barton JR, Odin Lindell, Chris Czerapowicz, Pierre Hampton, Christopher Ryan, Richard Hartman, Erkan Inan, Sebastian Norman

Preliminary round

|}

17th–24th place game

17th–20th place game

17th place game

Women's tournament

Players: Binta Drammeh, Danielle Hamilton Carter, Hanna Isaksson, Josefin Loob, Kalis Loyd, Katarina Milenkovic, Kristina Nybom, Louise Angel, Maria Gültekin, Martina Stålvant, Paula Juhlin, Pernilla Hansson, Salome Kabengano, Tilde Ahlin

Preliminary round

|}

Quarterfinal

5th–8th place game

5th place game

Fencing

Judo

Swimming

Table tennis

Weightlifting

Nations at the 2013 Summer Universiade
Univ
Sweden at the Summer Universiade